The incumbent mayor had lost the position after all three elections that had been held in Svendborg Municipality following the 2007 municipal reform. 

Bo Hansen from the Social Democrats had become mayor following the last election.  He intended to be re-elected following this election. 

In the election result, the Social Democrats would be the biggest winners. The whole red bloc would gain 2 seats and lose 1, and with 18 seats, it seemed like an easy path for Bo Hansen to continue. This was later confirmed. 

The constitution was agreed between the Danish Social Liberal Party, the Conservatives, Green Left, Danish People's Party and the Red–Green Alliance. This was remarkbly without Venstre who had become the second largest party. 

This was the first time that an incumbent mayor would be re-elected in the municipality since the 2007 municipal reform.

Electoral system
For elections to Danish municipalities, a number varying from 9 to 31 are chosen to be elected to the municipal council. The seats are then allocated using the D'Hondt method and a closed list proportional representation.
Svendborg Municipality had 29 seats in 2021

Unlike in Danish General Elections, in elections to municipal councils, electoral alliances are allowed.

Electoral alliances 

Electoral Alliance 1

Electoral Alliance 2

Electoral Alliance 3

Electoral Alliance 4

Electoral Alliance 5

Electoral Alliance 6

Results

Notes

References 

Svendborg